Edmontosaurini are a tribe of saurolophine hadrosaur dinosaurs that lived in the Northern Hemisphere during the Late Cretaceous period. It currently contains Edmontosaurus (from Canada and the United States), Shantungosaurus and Laiyangosaurus (from Shandong, China), and Kamuysaurus (from Japan).  Kerberosaurus and Kundurosaurus from Russia could also be members, though they are more likely saurolophins.

See also
 Timeline of hadrosaur research

References

Saurolophines